The greater hamster-rat, greater long-tailed pouched rat, or long-tailed pouched rat (Beamys major) is a species of rodent in the family Nesomyidae. It is found in Malawi, Tanzania, and Zambia. Its natural habitats are subtropical or tropical moist lowland forest and subtropical or tropical moist montane forest. It is threatened by habitat loss.

Sources
 Howell, K., Oguge, N. & Chitaukali, W. 2004.  Beamys major.   2006 IUCN Red List of Threatened Species.  Downloaded on 19 July 2007.

Beamys
Mammals described in 1914
Taxonomy articles created by Polbot